Volkmar Würtz (born 3 October 1938) is a German fencer. He represented the United Team of Germany at the 1964 Summer Olympics in the team épée event.

References

1938 births
Living people
German male fencers
Olympic fencers of the United Team of Germany
Fencers at the 1964 Summer Olympics
Sportspeople from Karlsruhe